The history of Persian Egypt is divided into two eras following the Achaemenid conquest of Egypt punctuated by an interval of independence: 
 Twenty-seventh Dynasty of Egypt (525–404 BC), also known as the First Egyptian Satrapy.
 Thirty-first Dynasty of Egypt (343–332 BC), also known as the Second Egyptian Satrapy.

Background 
In the 5th century BCE, Persian rulers, particularly Cyrus the Great, sought to expand their imperialist agenda to include Egypt. Expansionism was a key strategy for empires of the ancient world to establish military and economic dominance, and Egypt was a priority of Cyrus the Great's, in large part due to the desirability of the Nile river and valley as economic assets. The contemporaneous Egyptian pharaoh, Amasis, attempted to ward off the occupation by forming alliances with neighbouring rulers, in particular Polycrates of Samos, as those rulers also had a vested interest in preventing more significant Persian expansion in their region. This was successful for a time, and as such Persian occupation of Egypt was not achieved under Cyrus the Great. However, it would later be achieved under his son, Cambyses II.  Thus, Persian rule in Egypt, also referred to as the Achaemenid Empire, was initiated under the rule of Cambyses II, who ousted the last of the Dynasty XXVI pharaohs, Amasis’ son, Psammetichus III. Egypt became an important and prosperous resource for the Persian Empire. The Persian, or Achaemenid, Empire existed between 525 and 330 BCE, though Persian rule was not consistent for the entirety of that period, as there were periods of restoration of Egyptian independence, in particular, in between the first and second Egyptian Satrapies.

History - The First Egyptian Satrapy 
Cambyses II became the Pharaoh of Egypt after his successful subsumption of Egypt into the Persian Empire. In doing so, Cambyses II was given the Pharaoh name of Mesuti Ra, beginning the 27th dynasty (the first Egyptian Satrapy) which lasted from 525 to 404 BCE. A Pharaoh name was a significant tradition for Egyptian royalty as it highlighted the perception of the pharaoh as being a vessel for the gods, and therefore, a divine being in their own right. Though, following the conquest, Cambyses did try to maintain respect for Egyptian culture and traditions, sources suggest that he was unpopular, particularly amongst Egyptian priests, as the subsumption of Egypt into the Persian empire meant the erasure of Egyptian culture as the mainstream. This tension manifested itself by way of the introduction of Persian traditions and norms into Egyptian life and law. One of these norms was that Cambyses did not believe that citizens should be taxed to support the temples, as was Egyptian tradition, which further alienated him from the support of Egyptian priests. Throughout Egyptian history, the temples, and by extension, the priests, were given immense support and a celebrated status. Therefore, by posing a threat to the economic support structure of the religious aspect of Egyptian life, Cambyses fundamentally altered a core aspect of Egyptian culture and life. Additionally, the conquered Egyptian people were considered secondary, which further disenchanted Cambyses to his newly conquered people. In 523 BCE, Psammetichus III organized a revolt against the new Persian rule, demonstrating the displeasure amongst the Egyptian people at the commencement of the Achaemenid Empire. Supposedly, the revolt was overpowered by the Persian forces and Cambyses consequently saw to the destruction of numerous significant temples as a form of punishment and a demonstration of power, though the veracity of this sequence of events is unconfirmed.

Following Cambyses’ rule the Persian pharaohs were as follows:
Darius
Darius ruled from the year 522 to 486 BCE. The main legacy of this ruler can be seen in the building projects he commissioned (or, in some cases, the unfinished building projects that were completed under his leadership). In these architectural pursuits Persian influence can be seen, for example, through the introduction of Persian water systems. The water systems were superior to those that were standard in Egypt at the time, as the Persian empire was well known for their technological developments. Architecture is one of the most significant sources for providing understanding about ancient societies and their changing dynamics and periods, particularly those, like Egyptian society, for which there are minimal written sources to be studied. In this case, the archeological evidence provides greater insight into the influence of Persian occupation on architecture. Additionally, the architectural evidence can also provide insight into attempts at the preservation of Egyptian culture, as these Temples honoured Egyptian gods. Neither Darius, nor the other Persian Pharaohs, desired to completely erase the culture of the nations they conquered, they just implemented Persian customs alongside them. Darius’ rule also saw a number of revolts against Persian occupation, though none of these attempts at the re-establishment of sovereign Egyptian rule were successful.

Xerxes I
Xerxes I ruled from 486 to 465 BCE. His reign was mainly characterised by his intent and attempt to expand Persian rule to include Greece a venture in which, ultimately, he was not successful. Xerxes’ reign ended when he and his eldest son were assassinated by members of the court.

Artaxerxes I 
Artaxerxes was another of Xerxes’ sons whom the succession fell to after the deaths of his father and older brothers. Artaxerxes ruled, following the death of his father from 465 to 424 BCE. Artaxerxes I's reign saw the beginning of the decline of the 27th dynasty, due to rising tensions and threats to total Persian control. The most significant threat being the successful uprising orchestrated by an Egyptian rival ruler, Inaros, who consequently took control of part of Egypt. However, Persian rule remained in place in Memphis, meaning that Egypt was temporarily divided. However, the Egyptians were ultimately defeated and full reign was granted back to the Persian leadership.

Xerxes II
Artaxerxes I was followed by Xerxes II who ruled for only one year between 424 and 423 BCE. However, there is insufficient information on his reign as pharaoh, likely because it was too short for him to establish a significant legacy or enact meaningful change.

Darius II
Darius II ruled from 423 to 404 BCE and was the last Pharaoh of the 27th dynasty. His reign included him initiating conflict with Athens, and subsequently entering into an alliance with Sparta to support them in the war. This endeavour led to the Persian conquest of part of Ionia. Darius II's reign ended when a rebellion led by Egyptian Amyrtaeous, expelled him from Egypt and reinstated Egyptian rule. Though his successor, Artaxerxes II, did make attempts to restore Persian occupation, he faced numerous rebellions and uprisings and in the end, he was unsuccessful. Thus, there is debate over which Pharaoh, Darius II or Artaxerxes II, was the final ruler of the first period of Persian Egyptian rule. However, it was the ending of the reigns of those two rulers that marked the end of the first period of Persian Egypt.

History - the Second Egyptian Satrapy 
Persian rule of Egypt was reestablished within a century, beginning the Second Egyptian Satrapy. The second period of Persian occupation, between 358 and 330 BCE, was, overall, a shorter and more tumultuous period in which Persian dominance in Egypt was far from certain. Its end came about with Alexander the Great’s conquering of the Persian Empire, though the strength of the Persian rulers during this time in Egypt was fairly weak regardless, having only just re-established rule and facing consistent difficulties of succession conflicts and disloyalty within the court.

	Artaxerxes III 
The first Pharaoh of this second period of Persian rule of Egypt was Artaxerxes III who ruled from 358 to 338 BCE. Artaxerxes III subjugated Egypt during his reign as Persian ruler, going to war with the Egyptian Pharaoh Nectanebo II, and in doing so caused significant destruction in Egypt. Artaxerxes III's reign also saw a lot of building activity as well as military success. Military and architectural achievements were the two main contributing factors to the legacies of Egyptian rulers, as they were both, in their own ways, considered demonstrations of the strength and prosperity of the dynasty. In 338 BCE Artaxerxes died, ending his reign, however, the circumstances surrounding his death remain unclear, with some sources citing it as natural causes and others detailing an assassination plot by a military official, Bagoas, who then elevated Artaxerxes’ youngest son, Arses, to the throne.

	Arses
Arses ruled for only 3 years, from 338 to 336 BCE. The circumstances of his death, once again, are not entirely clear, though the same aforementioned sources that suggest Bagoas killed Artaxerxes III say that Arses was also assassinated by him.

	Darius III
Finally, Arses was succeeded by Darius III, a second cousin of Arses, who ruled from 336 to 330 BCE. The succession difficulties that marred this period of Persian rule of Egypt ultimately lead to an inconsistent grasp of power, and potentially contributed to the failure of the rulers to prevent external forces from imposing upon them. During Darius III's reign, Alexander the Great led the Macedonian army to victory in conquering the Persian Empire, as such, this ended Darius III's reign. Given that the Persian empire had been officially conquered, there was no Persian leader to become Darius III's successor, and thus ended the Achaemenid period of Egypt.

References

Ancient Egypt
Dynasties of ancient Egypt
History of Egypt by period
Achaemenid Egypt
Sasanian Empire

ar:أسرة مصرية حادية وثلاثون
cs:Druhá perská nadvláda
arz:تاريخ مصر الفارسيه
fi:Egyptin historia Persian vallan alla